Charlie Donnelly (born 2 June 1983) is an Irish former racing driver who won the 2005 Formula Ford Great Britain championship.

Career
Donnelly was born in Naas, Ireland. He began racing in karting, and in September 2001 was named Irish motorsport's "Young Racing Driver of the Month". 

He moved into racing Formula Ford in 2002, competing in four races in the UK Zetec Championship at Mondello Park and Donington Park. His best finish was 9th, and scored 23 points in the championship. For 2003, he competed in the scholarship class of Formula Ford Great Britain, and won one race and scored six podiums on the way to 6th place in the championship for ComTec Racing. For 2004, he moved into the new Mygale SJ04 chassis with Jamun Racing and won four races, scored his first pole and two fastest laps. His wins came at Donington Park, Knockhill, Thruxton and Brands Hatch. He finished the season in 7th place overall. His biggest success came in 2005, once again with Jamun Racing and the Mygale chassis, he won the Formula Ford Great Britain Championship. Over the 20 races, Donnelly won four, scored a further fourteen podiums, one pole and eight fastest laps.  At Croft, he won both races and it would only be on three occasions - at Silverstone and Snetterton - that he did not appear on the podium.

In the off-season, he tested a Formula Ford 2000 car at Road Atlanta alongside J.R. Hildebrand.

After racing
Donnelly is now based in his hometown of Naas, and runs a car dealership.

Racing Record

Career Summary

References

1983_births
Living_people
Irish_motorsport_people
Irish_racing_drivers
People_from_Naas
Sportspeople_from_County_Kildare
Formula_Ford_drivers
Comtec Racing drivers